Taepodong-1 was a three-stage technology demonstrator developed by North Korea, a development step toward an intermediate-range ballistic missile.  The missile was derived originally from the Scud rocket and was tested once in 1998 as a space launch vehicle.  As a space launch vehicle, it was sometimes called the Paektusan 1.

History

On August 31, 1998, North Korea announced that they had used this rocket to launch their first satellite Kwangmyŏngsŏng-1 from a pad on the Musudan-ri peninsula. However, the satellite failed to achieve orbit; outside observers conjecture that the additional third stage either failed to fire or malfunctioned.  This is contrary to official statements of the North Korean state media, which stated that the satellite achieved orbit about 5 minutes after launch. On this single launch, the main two-stage booster flew for 1,646 km without any significant problems.

The rocket was launched eastward, passing over Japan at an altitude of over 200 km.  The second stage came down into the Pacific Ocean about 60 km past Japan, and the third stage about 600 km beyond Japan.  According to post-launch analysis of the launch vehicle, debris from the third stage fell as far as 4,000 kilometers from the launch pad.  Some analysts believe that a three-stage space booster variant of the Taepodong-1 could be capable of travelling as far as 5,900 kilometers with a very small payload.

In 2003 the US Defense Intelligence Agency reported to the Congress: "We have no information to suggest Pyongyang intends to deploy the Taepo Dong 1 (TD-1) as a surface-to-surface missile in North Korea. We believe instead that the vehicle was a test bed for multi-stage missile technologies." In 2009 the US National Air and Space Intelligence Center assessed that the Taepodong-1 was a technology demonstrator, a development step toward longer-range missile development.

The Taepodong-2, or Unha-2, was the successor to the Taepodong-1 technology demonstrator, with a first (unsuccessful) test launch in 2006.

Description
Liftoff thrust: 525.25 kN
Total mass: 33,406 kg
Diameter: 1.80 m
Length: 25.80 m
Range with 1,500 kg of payload: 2,000 km
Range with 1,000 kg of payload: 2,500 km
Range with 50 kg of payload and third stage: 6,000 km

The rocket's first stage is a Rodong-1 MRBM, and the second stage uses a single engine from the Rodong-1.

In a nominal space launch, the first stage burns for 95 seconds, before separating, and landing about  downrange. The payload fairing separates 144 seconds after launch. This is followed by the depletion and separation of the second stage, 266 seconds into the flight, resulting in an impact about  downrange. The third stage, which is spin-stabilised, then burns for 27 seconds to insert the payload into low Earth orbit. The payload is estimated at 6 kg mass.

See also
 Korean People's Army Strategic Force
 Military of North Korea

References

External links
 Encyclopedia Astronautica
 Federation of American Scientists

Space launch vehicles of North Korea
Ballistic missiles of North Korea
Intermediate-range ballistic missiles of North Korea